Sayula is a town and municipality in the Mexican state of Jalisco, approximately 100 kilometers south of Guadalajara. It is surrounded by smaller towns, such as Usmajac, San Andres, El Reparo, and Amacueca.

Sayula is the birthplace of influential Mexican novelist and short story writer Juan Rulfo. According to the official page of Juan Rulfo, he was born in Apulco, Jalisco, which is close to San Gabriel, Jalisco, and his birth was registered in Sayula, Jalisco. (1917: Nacimiento de Juan Rulfo, el 16 de mayo. Él sostuvo haber venido al mundo en Apulco, localidad cercana a San Gabriel, Jalisco. Es registrado en la ciudad de Sayula, Jalisco.)

Sayula is a traditional Mexican town. Its population is approximately 45,755. It has a "plaza" that holds many festivities. During the holidays, some of its downtown streets are closed to hold a great market (mercado) full of various merchandise to sell and buy. Sayula's downtown church is one that excites the admiration of visitors.

Sayula is also known for its exquisite cajeta (caramel). It is one of its many attributes, among many others such as, a gorgeous cathedral and chapels. Sayula holds many festivities such as the well known Carnaval which draws inspiration from the Brazilian Carnival where we can witness some exotic traditions of dances and customs along with floats and cart vendors peddling goods.

History 

In the early 1870s, according to John Lewis Geiger, who was making a voyage across Mexico at the time; Sayula was at the time involved in the production of salt and pulque. From his account, the town was described as having badly-paved roads and being filled with white-washed, low adobe houses. In the 1890s, Sayula is reported to have had a population of approximately 10,655. During this same period, the town had a variety of merchants of goods from carriages and ironware, to arms and ammunition.

Government

Municipal presidents

References

External links
 official page

Municipalities of Jalisco